Xenoglossa is a genus of large squash bees in the family Apidae. There are about 11 described species in Xenoglossa.

Species
These 11 species belong to the genus Xenoglossa:
 Xenoglossa angustior Cockerell, 1899
 Xenoglossa dugesi Cockerell
 Xenoglossa fulva Smith, 1854
 Xenoglossa gabbii (Cresson, 1878)
 Xenoglossa howardi Cockerell
 Xenoglossa kansensis Cockerell, 1905 (Kansas squash bee)
 Xenoglossa mustelina (Fox, 1893)
 Xenoglossa patricia Cockerell, 1896
 Xenoglossa rhodophila Cockerell
 Xenoglossa spriuna Howard
 Xenoglossa strenua (Cresson, 1878)

References

Further reading

External links

 

Apinae
Articles created by Qbugbot